Stephen Lawrence Petro (October 21, 1914 – August 15, 1994) was an American football guard who played two seasons with the Brooklyn Dodgers of the National Football League (NFL). He was drafted by the Pittsburgh Pirates in the ninth round of the 1939 NFL Draft. He played college football at the University of Pittsburgh and attended Greater Johnstown High School in Johnstown, Pennsylvania.

Steve played football for the Pittsburgh Panthers under head coach Jock Sutherland and later was an assistant football coach for the Panthers from 1950 to 1972. He was also the Assistant to the Athletic Director from 1973 to 1984. Steve's Pitt nickname was "The Rock," based on Petro, a derivation of the Greek word petros, which means rock. The Pitt Panther mascot's nickname is ROC, in Steve's honor.

References

External links
Just Sports Stats
 

1914 births
1994 deaths
Players of American football from Pennsylvania
American football guards
Pittsburgh Panthers football players
Pittsburgh Panthers football coaches
Brooklyn Dodgers (NFL) players
Sportspeople from Johnstown, Pennsylvania